East Wickham is a district in south-east London, England, within the London Borough of Bexley. Prior to the creation of Greater London in 1965, East Wickham was in the administrative county of Kent.

History
The name is thought to be a corruption of the Latin 'vicus', indicating a Roman settlement along Watling Street, with the place name 'Estwycham' first being recorded in 1284. The 'east' was added to differentiate it from West Wickham, situated some distance away to the south-west.

The larger settlement of Welling originally formed part of the ancient manor of East Wickham, which was centred on St Michael's Church, Upper Wickham Lane, built in the 13th century. In the Domesday Book (1086) East Wickham was included as part of the return for Plumstead and the church was originally a chapel of St Nicholas’ Church in Plumstead, within the Little and Lesnes Hundred. It became a civil parish in its own right in 1854 and formed part of Dartford Rural District from 1894. It ceased to be a civil parish and was absorbed by the Bexley Urban District on 1 October 1902. The area was largely rural in character until the early 20th century, with large scale house building beginning in the area from 1916 onwards.

Transport
Several Transport for London bus services connect East Wickham with areas including Welling, Eltham, Bexleyheath, Plumstead, Woolwich, Abbey Wood, North Greenwich, Thamesmead and Dartford. The nearest rail link to the area is Welling railway station.

Notable residents

Kate Bush, singer-songwriter.

References

Areas of London
Districts of the London Borough of Bexley
Former civil parishes in the London Borough of Bexley